WAMW-FM (107.9 FM) is a radio station broadcasting a classic hits format. Licensed to Washington, Indiana, United States, the station is currently owned by Dewayne Shake, through licensee Shake Broadcasting, LLC, and features programming from ABC Radio  and Jones Radio Network.

History
The station went on the air as WAMW-FM on August 29, 1989.  On February 4, 2000, the station changed its call sign to WYER, and on October 1, 2001 the station reverted to WAMW-FM

References

External links

AMW-FM